Petar Dajak is a Croatian former footballer who played in the Croatian First Football League, and the Canadian Professional Soccer League.

Playing career 
Dajak played with NK TŠK Topolovac in the Croatian First Football League in 2001-2002, and appeared in seven matches. In 2003, Ivan Marković signed Dajak to a contract to play for the Hamilton Thunder of the Canadian Professional Soccer League. He helped Hamilton to a seven game undefeated streak to retain their position on top of the standings in their conference. On the conclusion of the 2003 season Hamilton clinched their first trophy the Western Conference title and qualified for the postseason. Dajak featured in the playoff semi-final match against the Vaughan Shooters, but Hamilton were eliminated from competition after losing the match by a score of 2-0.

References 

Living people
Croatian footballers
Hamilton Thunder players
Croatian Football League players
Canadian Soccer League (1998–present) players
NK TŠK Topolovac players
Expatriate soccer players in Canada
Croatian expatriate sportspeople in Canada
Association football defenders
Year of birth missing (living people)